August Tõllasepp (2 November 1885, in Konguta Parish (now Elva Parish), Kreis Dorpat – 18 December 1970, in Tartu) was an Estonian politician and meteorologist. He was a member of III, IV and V Riigikogu.

1932-1937 he was First Assistant Secretary of V Riigikogu.

References

1885 births
1970 deaths
People from Elva Parish
People from Kreis Dorpat
Estonian People's Party politicians
National Centre Party (Estonia) politicians
Members of the Riigikogu, 1926–1929
Members of the Riigikogu, 1929–1932
Members of the Riigikogu, 1932–1934